is a Japanese manga series written and illustrated by Ai Kozaki. It revolves around the life of a timid girl who joins a naginata club to improve herself. It was serialized in Shogakukan's Big Comic Spirits magazine from January 2011 to September 2020, with its chapters compiled into thirty-four tankōbon volumes.

It was adapted into a stage play in 2017. A Live-action film adaptation of the manga was released in September 2017.

As of September 2020, the manga had over 3.9 million copies in circulation. in 2015, Asahinagu won the 60th Shogakukan Manga Award in the General category.

Plot
Asahi Higashijima entered Futatsuzaka High School in Tokyo. In her junior high school days, she was in the art club. On the first day of school when she was thinking about joining the sports club in high school, she met Maharu Miyaji on the train on her way to school. On the day of the club activity introduction at school, she ended up going to see the naginata club, and when she went to see it, she admired Maharu and decided to join the club because she wanted to become a strong person.

Characters
Asahi Tōjima
Maharu Miyaji
Shōko Yasomura
Sakura Konno

Media

Manga
Asahinagu is written and illustrated by Ai Kozaki. The manga was serialized in Shogakukan's Big Comic Spirits from January 24, 2011 to September 7, 2020. Shogakukan has compiled its chapters into individual tankōbon volumes. The first volume was published on April 28, 2011. The 34th and final volume was published on September 30, 2020.

Volume list

Live-action film

A live action film adaptation of the manga was released on September 22, 2017; starring the idols of Nogizaka46.

Stage play
It was adapted into a stage play in 2017.

Reception
Asahinagu won the award for Best General Manga at the 60th Shogakukan Manga Award in 2015. The manga won the Mandō Kobayashi Manga Grand Prix 2016, created by comedian and manga enthusiast Kendo Kobayashi. Asahinagu ranked 17th on Takarajimasha's Kono Manga ga Sugoi! list of best manga of 2012 for male readers. The manga ranked 9th on the "Nationwide Bookstore Employees' Recommended Comics" by the Honya Club website in 2012.

As of September 2020, the manga had over 3.9 million copies in circulation. Volume 5 reached the 26th place on the weekly Oricon manga charts and, as of June 3, 2012, has sold 22,686 copies; volume 6 reached the 29th place and, as of September 2, 2012, has sold 23,253 copies; volume 9 reached the 45th place and, as of August 4, 2013, has sold 27,893 copies; volume 10 reached the 39th place and, as of December 1, 2013, has sold 19,230 copies and volume 12 reached the 37th place and, as of August 3, 2014, has sold 23,263 copies.

References

External links
  
 

 
2011 manga
Manga adapted into films
Martial sports in anime and manga
Shogakukan franchises
Shogakukan manga
Seinen manga
Winners of the Shogakukan Manga Award for general manga